The Battle of Gwoździec was fought in 1531 as part of the Polish-Moldavian Wars.

The conflict was instigated by voievod Petru Rareş of Moldavia when he interfered in the succession disputes over the Hungarian throne and invaded southern Poland in support of the Ottomans. Grand Hetman Jan Tarnowski, the leader of the Polish counter-offensive, attacked and ultimately defeated Petru's forces at Gwoździec near Kolomyia, Ukraine. Tarnowski withdrew his forces northeast, but was outnumbered and besieged during the Battle of Obertyn.

Since 1945 the town of Gwoździec has been located in Ukraine and known as Hvizdets.

References

1531 in Europe
Conflicts in 1531
Gwozdiec
Gwozdiec
Military history of Ukraine
1530s in Poland